Wesley-Thomas Lança Timóteo (born April 9, 2000) is a Canadian professional soccer player who plays as a forward for Canadian Premier League club HFX Wanderers.

Early life
Timoteo was born and raised in Montreal. At the age of nine, he played youth soccer with SC Panellinios, while also being part of the École Sportive de
Montréal Canada program. In 2013, he joined the Montreal Impact Academy. 

At the age of fourteen, Timoteo headed to Europe and featured in the Swedish Gothia Cup tournament. From there, he moved to Portugal where he joined C.F. Esperança de Lagos, and later moved to Belenenses in June 2015. He later spent time in the academy of Estoril.

Club career 
In 2018, he made one appearance for Belenenses in the Portuguese fifth tier. During the 2019-20 season, he appeared for Estoril Praia B in the fifth tier.

In 2020, Timoteo signed with Cypriot First Division side PO Xylotymbou, making twenty league appearances and one appearance in the Cypriot Cup that season.

In 2021, he returned to Portugal with S.C. Lusitânia in the fifth tier Liga Meo Azores.

In March 2022, Timoteo trialed with Canadian Premier League club FC Edmonton. With Edmonton experiencing significant financial difficulties, Timoteo was signed by fellow CPL club HFX Wanderers and immediately loaned to the Edmonton.   He scored his first professional goal on May 14 against Pacific FC. In the final game of the season on October 8, he scored the winning goal from a direct free kick in a 3-1 victory over Valour FC. In December 2022, HFX announced they had signed Timoteo to a new contract through 2024, with an option for 2025.

International career
In 2012, he represented Canada at the 2012 Danone Nations Cup, an Under-12 tournament.

In February 2016, Timoteo participated in an evaluation camp for the Canadian U-17 national team.

Career statistics

References

External links

2000 births
Living people
Association football forwards
Canadian soccer players
Portuguese footballers
Soccer players from Montreal
Canadian people of Portuguese descent
Canadian expatriate soccer players
Portuguese expatriate footballers
Expatriate footballers in Cyprus
Canadian expatriate sportspeople in Cyprus
Portuguese expatriate sportspeople in Cyprus
C.F. Os Belenenses players
G.D. Estoril Praia players
P.O. Xylotymbou players
HFX Wanderers FC players
FC Edmonton players
Cypriot First Division players
Canadian Premier League players